The Football club Blida, commonly abbreviated as FC Blida or FCB, is a former Algerian football club based in Blida.

Formed on 4 October 1904, FC Blida became known, The Dean teams of the Algiers. The club won six titles including the Algiers champion of Division Honor, four Forconi Cup, two Championship and North African Cup.

During the independence of Algeria in 1962, FCB was dissolved like most other clubs.

History

Stadium
The FCB Stadium was inaugurated in 1924. After 1962 the stadium was renamed Zoubir Zouraghi Stadium (Stade Chahid Zoubir Zouraghi). It have a capacity of 3,000 places.

Honours

Domestic competitions
 League Algiers Football Association
Champion (6): 1921, 1922, 1923, 1924, 1929 and 1953.

 Forconi Cup
Winner (4): 1946, 1952, 1954 and 1957.

International competitions
North African Championship
Winner (1): 1923 and 1929.

North African Cup
Winner (1): 1952

Notable players
  Pierre Chesneau
  Georges Bonello
  Henri Salvano
  Georges Riera
  Claude Sicard
  Charly Camand
  Guy Zaragozi
  Alain Torres
  Tonio Torres
  Bernard Rahis
  Armand Libérati
  Sauveur Rodriguez
  Dahmane Meftah
  Djilali Hasni

References

External links
Club profile – Footballdatabase
 blidanostalgie.pagesperso-orange.fr

Defunct football clubs in Algeria
Association football clubs established in 1904
Association football clubs disestablished in 1962
1962 disestablishments in Algeria